The Foundation for Middle East Peace (FMEP) is an American nonprofit organization. It states it promotes a just solution to the Israeli-Palestinian conflict through grants, public programming, and research. The organization was established in 1979 by Merle Thorpe Jr. Lara Friedman is the current President of the Foundation.

Activities
The Foundation advances its goals through education and advocacy and the publication of books and pamphlets about the conflict. FMEP also has a speakers’ program to introduce Israeli, Palestinian, and other experts to U.S. audiences and its own officers also engage in public speaking. The organization also has a small grant program to support groups that contribute to peace between Israel and Palestine.

FMEP pays particular attention to the effect that Israeli settlements have on Israeli-Palestinian peace efforts. In 1992, the Foundation introduced its bimonthly "Report on Israeli Settlements in the Occupied Territories." The Report contains detailed information and analysis on settlements and related issues.

Trustees, officers, and staff
FMEP Officers are:

Lara Friedman is the President of the Foundation for Middle East Peace.  Lara was the Director of Policy and Government Relations at Americans for Peace Now, and before that she was a U.S. Foreign Service Officer,  serving in Jerusalem, Washington, Tunis and Beirut.
Kristin McCarthy is the Director of Policy & Operations. Prior to joining FMEP Kristin worked at the Arab American Institute.

Past Presidents of FMEP: Matthew Duss, Ambassador Philip Wilcox (ret).

Funding
The Foundation for Middle East Peace supports its publication, education, outreach, and grant programs with funds from an endowment from its founder, the late Merle Thorpe Jr., and from donations. The Foundation is a non-profit private foundation qualified under Section 501(c)(3) of the Internal Revenue Code.

References

External links
 Foundation for Middle East Peace website

Political and economic research foundations in the United States
Non-governmental organizations involved in the Israeli–Palestinian peace process